Impatiens noli-tangere (touch-me-not balsam; Latin impatiēns "impatient" or "not allowing", and nōlī tangere "do not touch": literally "be unwilling to touch") is an annual herbaceous plant in the family Balsaminaceae found in damp places in Europe, Asia and North America. The yellow flowers are followed by pods which forcefully explode when ripe, ejecting the seeds for some distance.

It is also called touch-me-not, yellow balsam, jewelweed, western touch-me-not or wild balsam.

References

External links

Jepson Manual Treatment
USDA Plants Profile

noli-tangere
Plants described in 1753
Flora of Europe
Flora of Asia
Flora of North America
Taxa named by Carl Linnaeus